Charles Edward Robinson (5 April 1927 – 4 March 1983) was a New Zealand rugby union player. A flanker, Robinson represented  at a provincial level, and was a member of the New Zealand national side, the All Blacks, in 1951 and 1952. He played 11 matches for the All Blacks including five internationals.

References

1927 births
1983 deaths
People from Bluff, New Zealand
New Zealand rugby union players
New Zealand international rugby union players
Southland rugby union players
Rugby union flankers
Rugby union players from Southland, New Zealand